The 2012 South Dakota State Jackrabbits football team represented South Dakota State University in the 2012 NCAA Division I FCS football season. They were led by 15th year head coach John Stiegelmeier and played their home games at Coughlin–Alumni Stadium. They were a member of the Missouri Valley Football Conference. They finished the season 9–4, 6–2 in MVFC play to finish in second place. The received an at–large bid to the FCS Playoffs where they defeated Eastern Illinois in the first round before falling to fellow MVFC member North Dakota State in the second round.

Schedule

References

South Dakota State
South Dakota State Jackrabbits football seasons
South Dakota State
South Dakota State Jackrabbits football